School of Life Sciences (Central South University) was founded in May 2003. It was formerly known as School of Biological Science and Technology (Central South University) before April 2013.

Schools in China
Central South University
Educational institutions established in 2003
2003 establishments in China